Sahitya Akademi Translation Prizes are given each year to writers for their outstanding translations work in the 24 languages, since 1989.

Recipients  
Following is the list of recipients of Sahitya Akademi translation prizes for their works written in Odia. The award, as of 2019, consisted of 50,000.

See also 

 List of Sahitya Akademi Award winners for Odia

References

External links
 Akademi Translation Prizes For Odia Language

Sahitya Akademi Translation Prize
Odia
Indian literary awards
Odia-language literary awards